Klingengraben  is a river of the Canton of Schaffhausen, northern Switzerland and Baden-Württemberg, south-western Germany. It passes through Klettgau and flows into the Wutach in Lauchringen.

See also
List of rivers of Baden-Württemberg

References

Rivers of Baden-Württemberg
Rivers of the canton of Schaffhausen
Rivers of Switzerland
Rivers of Germany
International rivers of Europe